Pierre de Pardaillan de Gondrin (1692 – 4 November 1733) was the Duke-Bishop of Langres, France.

Gondrin was born in Versailles, the son of Louis Antoine de Pardaillan de Gondrin, duc d'Antin, and grandson of Madame de Montespan.  He was a doctor of theology and canon of Paris and of Strasbourg. He became Duke-bishop of Langres and Peer of France in 1724. He was elected an honorary member of the Académie des Inscriptions et Belles-Lettres in 1720 and, without having ever written a single work, a member of the Académie Française in 1725. He died in Bougey.

External links
 Académie française

1692 births
1733 deaths
Members of the Académie Française
Bishops of Langres
Pierre
Members of the Académie des Inscriptions et Belles-Lettres
18th-century peers of France